The Thüringer Energie Team was a German UCI Continental cycling team that existed from 2006 to 2013.

Many famous cyclists such as Marcel Kittel, Tony Martin, John Degenkolb, Maximilian Schachmann, and Jasha Sütterlin rode for the team.

References

Defunct cycling teams based in Germany
Cycling teams based in Germany
Cycling teams established in 2006
Cycling teams disestablished in 2013
UCI Continental Teams (Europe)